JOA or Joa may refer to:

 Joint operating agreement, of the US Newspaper Preservation Act of 1970
 Judgment of acquittal, a type of judgment as a matter of law
 Jøa, an island in Norway
 Joá, a neighborhood in Rio de Janeiro, Brazil
 Air Swift Aviation (ICAO code); See List of airline codes
 Joa Elfsberg (born 1979), Swedish female ice hockey player

See also
 Jehoash (disambiguation) or Joas